Cadila Pharmaceuticals is an Indian multinational pharmaceutical company  based in Ahmedabad, Gujarat, India. The company's operations focus on manufacturing products ranging from API's-Intermediates, finished formulations, OTC-Food Supplements, Biotechnology Products and pharmaceutical Machinery. 

Cadila Pharmaceuticals manufacturing facilities are approved by International bodies such as WHO-GMP, UK-MHRA, USFDA-API, TGA-Australia, and AIFA-Italy. The company's international operation of is spread across 58 countries including the Americas, Japan, Asia, CIS and Africa.

History

Cadila Laboratories 
In 1951 Indravadan A Modi had quit his job as a chemist in a Mumbai firm to start Cadila Laboratories with childhood friend Ramanbhai Patel. The company started in a rented bungalow with a capital of Rs 25,000 and achieved a turnover of around Rs 1.25 lakh in its first year of operation.

1995: Birth of Cadila Pharmaceuticals 
The Modi and Patel families decided to split the business in 1995, two entities were formed - Cadila Pharmaceuticals Ltd (owned and controlled by Shri. I A Modi and his son Dr. Rajiv Modi) and Cadila Healthcare (owned by Shri. Ramanbhai Patel and his son Pankaj Patel family). Rajiv Modi and I A Modi worked closely to run Cadila Pharma, now considered one of the largest privately held pharma companies in the country.

Operations  
Cadila Pharmaceuticals has its formulation manufacturing facilities at Dholka, Gujarat (India); Samba, Jammu (India) and at Addis Ababa (Ethiopia) and  2 API manufacturing facilities are located at Ankleshwar, Gujarat. The manufacturing facility at Dholka and the API unit at Ankleshwar in Gujarat are USFDA-certified; the overseas manufacturing facility at Ethiopia is the WHO - cGMP compliant facility.

Research 
Cadila Pharmaceuticals has established a dedicated R&D facility, spread over 1,05,000 sq. ft. area at Dholka, Gujarat, India which is staffed by 300 scientists.

The company has five IND dossiers filed with the USFDA for pulmonary tuberculosis, lung cancer, prostate cancer, bladder cancer and melanoma. The company has submitted ten ANDAs.
Cadila Pharmaceuticals has connections with various institutions for research; Department of Biotechnology, UDSC, New Delhi; IISc, Bangalore; Lala Ram Sarup Institute of TB & Respiratory diseases, New Delhi; RRL, Jammu; CSIR, New Delhi; CDRI, Lucknow; Advanced Transfusion Medicine Research Foundation, Ahmedabad; National Institute of Immunology, New Delhi; Institute of Microbial Technology, Chandigarh; Talwar Research Foundation, New Delhi and Trieste, Italy.

Products and services 
Cadila Pharmaceuticals is the only Indian manufacturer of natural Streptokinase and Hyaluronic Acid products. The company was also the first in the world to introduce Rabeprazole in IV form – 'Rabeloc'. In 2009, the world's first boosted-Rifampicin fixed-dose combination for the treatment of Tuberculosis – 'Risorine' and world's first drug combination for prevention of Cardiovascular Diseases – 'Polycap' were introduced by Cadila Pharmaceuticals.
For the patients with Non Small Cell Lung Cancer (NSCLC), the company introduced 'Mycidac-C' - first in the class active immunotherapy as well as drug targeting Desmocollin.
Some of the top brands of the company are Aciloc,  Envas, Calcirol, Haem Up, Vasograin, Tricort, Fludac, Rabiloc, Trigan-D, Mycobutol and Sepsivac.

Alliances 
In 2019, Cadila Pharmaceuticals formed a partnership with Norwegian start-up, Serca Pharmaceuticals  to develop new treatment for heart patients.

Awards and recognition 
Most Trusted Companies of 2008, Sara Media and Zee Business

WorldStar Packaging Award, 2018

TISS LeapVault CLO Award, 2019

Observenow Future of Workplace Award, 2019

Great Place to Work Certified, 2020

References 

Companies based in Ahmedabad
Pharmaceutical companies established in 1951
Pharmaceutical companies of India
Indian brands
1951 establishments in Bombay State